Kerry County Council is the authority responsible for local government in County Kerry, Ireland. As a county council, it is governed by the Local Government Act 2001. The council is responsible for housing and community, roads and transportation, urban planning and development, amenity and culture, and environment. The council has 33 elected members. Elections are held every five years and are by single transferable vote. The head of the council has the title of Cathaoirleach (Chairperson). The county administration is headed by a Chief Executive, Moira Murrell. The county town is Tralee.

History

1898 to 1922
 Following the independence of the Irish Free State, responsibility for local government was taken by the new government.

Kerry County Council was created by the Local Government (Ireland) Act 1898, legislation passed by the Parliament of the United Kingdom, of which Ireland formed a part at that time. The 1898 act introduced elected county councils to Ireland, following their establishment in England and Wales in 1889 and Scotland in 1890. The first election was held on 6 April 1899, and the council first met on 22 April. The first council had 30 members. Of these, 22 were directly elected for single-member county electoral divisions. The remainder of the council consisted of the chairmen of the 6 rural district councils, who were ex officio members and an additional 2 members who were chosen by co-option. The council initially met in the former Grand Jury room of the Tralee Courthouse in Nelson Street (now Ashe Street), and elections of the entire council were held every three years.

In January 1910 the council moved its headquarters to a purpose-built county hall on Godfrey Place. The method of election was changed to proportional representation under the Local Government (Ireland) Act 1919, with the first elections under the new system held on 2 June 1920. The election took place during the Irish War of Independence, and control of the council was won by Sinn Féin. The building was set on fire by British Black and Tans during the Siege of Tralee of November 1920.

Post-independence
During the Irish Civil War, the government used its powers to dissolve the council in May 1923, with a commissioner appointed to conduct the business of the council. A new council was elected in May 1926. The council moved to new premises, the Ashe Memorial Hall, Denny Street, Tralee in March 1928. In September 1930 the council was again dissolved and a commissioner appointed. Following the election of a Fianna Fáil government, the Councillors displaced in 1930 were restored to office in May 1932.

In 1942 the number of Councillors was reduced from 30 to 26. At the same time the county management system was introduced. The council was again dissolved in May 1945, with elections resuming in October 1948. In 1953 the term of office for Councillors was increased from 3 to 5 years, and in 1985 the number of Councillors was increased to the present number of 27. In January 1989 the council moved to Áras an Chontae, Rathass.

The council is responsible for housing and community, roads and transportation, urban planning and development, amenity and culture, and environment.

Local Electoral Areas and Municipal Districts
Kerry County Council is divided into the following municipal districts and local electoral areas, defined by electoral divisions.

Councillors
The following were elected at the 2019 Kerry County Council election, under the boundaries which existed at the time.

Councillors by electoral area
This list reflects the order in which Councillors were elected on 24 May 2019.

Notes

Co-options

References

External links

Politics of County Kerry
County councils in the Republic of Ireland